The Kid  is a 1921 American silent comedy-drama film written, produced, directed by and starring Charlie Chaplin, and features Jackie Coogan as his foundling baby, adopted son and sidekick. This was Chaplin's first full-length film as a director. It was a huge success and was the second-highest-grossing film in 1921. Now considered one of the greatest films of the silent era, in 2011 it was selected for preservation in the United States National Film Registry by the Library of Congress.

Plot
With much anguish, an unwed Mother abandons her child, placing him in an expensive automobile with a handwritten note: "Please love and care for this orphan child". Two thieves steal the car and leave the baby in an alley, where he is found by The Tramp. After some attempts to hand off the child on to various passers-by, he finds the note and his heart melts. He takes the boy home, names him John and adjusts his household furniture for him. Meanwhile, the Mother has a change of heart and returns for her baby; when she learns that the car has been stolen, she faints.

Five years pass. The Kid and the Tramp live in the same tiny room; they have little money but much love. They support themselves in a minor scheme: the Kid throws stones to break windows so that the Tramp, working as a glazier, can be paid to repair them. Meanwhile, the Mother has become a wealthy actress and does charity by giving presents to poor children. By chance, as she does so, the Mother and the Kid unknowingly cross paths.

The Kid later gets into a fight with another local boy as people in the area gather to watch the spectacle. The Kid wins, drawing the ire of the other boy's older brother, who attacks the Tramp as a result. The Mother breaks up the fight, but it starts again after she leaves and the Tramp keeps beating the "Big Brother" over the head with a brick between swings until he totters away.

Shortly afterward, the Mother advises the Tramp to call a doctor after the Kid falls ill. The doctor discovers that the Tramp is not the Kid's father and notifies authorities. Two men come to take the boy to an orphanage, but after a fight and a chase, the Tramp and the boy remain side by side. When the Mother comes back to see how the boy is doing she encounters the doctor, who shows her the note (which he had taken from the Tramp); she recognizes it as the one she left with her baby years ago.

Now fugitives, the Tramp and the boy spend the night in a flophouse. Its proprietor learns of a $1,000 reward offered by the authorities and takes the Kid to the police station, while the Tramp is asleep. As the tearful Mother is reunited with her long-lost child, the Tramp searches frantically for the missing boy. Unsuccessful, he returns to the doorway of their humble lodgings, where he falls asleep, entering a "Dreamland" where his neighbors have turned into angels and devils. A policeman awakes him and drives him off to a mansion. There the door is opened by the Mother and the Kid, who jumps into the Tramp's arms, and he is welcomed in.

Cast

 Charlie Chaplin as The Tramp
 Jackie Coogan as the Kid ("John")
 Edna Purviance as the Woman (John's mother)
 Carl Miller as the Man (John's father)

Uncredited
 Tom Wilson as the Policeman
 Henry Bergman as night shelter keeper/Professor Guido/fat neighborhood man/apostle Peter
 Charles Reisner as neighborhood bully/angel's lover
 Raymond Lee as bully's little brother
 Lita Grey as flirtatious angel in Dreamland scene
 Jules Hanft as the country doctor
 Frank Campeau as welfare officer
 F. Blinn as welfare officer's assistant
 Jack H. Coogan Jr. as Pickpocket/Guest/Devil
 Granville Redmond as the Man's friend
 May White as the Woman's maid/apartment owner with broken window
 Silas Merric Hathaway as the infant Kid
 Albert Austin as man in shelter/the car thief/Devil
 Esther Ralston as angel in the heaven scene
 Arthur Thalasso as the car thief with gun/Devil

Production

Chaplin wrote, produced, directed, edited and starred in The Kid, and later composed a score. Innovative in its combination of comedic and dramatic elements, the film is considered one of the greatest of the silent era. Chaplin biographer Jeffrey Vance maintains that, with its "perfect blend of comedy and drama, [it] is arguably Chaplin's most personal and autobiographical work.”

The film made Coogan, then a vaudeville performer, into the first major child star of the movies. It has been speculated that the depth of the relationship portrayed in the film may have been connected with the death of Chaplin's firstborn infant son just ten days before the production began.

After production was completed in 1920, the film was caught up in the divorce actions of Chaplin's first wife Mildred Harris, who sought to attach Chaplin's assets. Chaplin and his associates smuggled the raw negative to Salt Lake City (reportedly packed in coffee cans) and edited the film in a room at the Hotel Utah. Before releasing the film Chaplin negotiated for and received an enhanced financial deal for the film with his distributor, First National Corporation, based on the success of the final film.

Chaplin eventually removed scenes he believed too sentimental for modern audiences and composed and recorded a new musical score for the film's theatrical reissue. This re-edited version of The Kid had its world premiere as the Film Society of Lincoln Center gala tribute to Chaplin held on April 4, 1972 at Philharmonic Hall, New York City, with Chaplin in attendance.

Reception
The Kid premiered on January 21, 1921 at Carnegie Hall in New York City as a benefit for the Children’s Fund of the National Board of Review of Motion Pictures.

The Kid was acclaimed by film critics upon its release. The February 5, 1921 issue of Exhibitor's Herald, contained a full-spread advertisement for the film playing at the Randolph Theatre. The advertisement from First National Pictures featured high praise from Chicago-based newspapers including this review from The Chicago Herald and Examiner:"The Kid settles once and for all the question as to who is the greatest theatrical artist in the world. Chaplin does some of the finest, most delicately shaded acting you ever saw anywhere, and for every slapstick furore in it there is a classic, exquisite scene. His action are riotous, convulsive, irresistible. The gentlest grandmother will bust a midriff. He's the best Hamlet alive today. Jackie Coogan is the best child actor you ever saw. Women wept just to see him. The Kid is two fisted. It's right glove is packed with the pearls of tears, its left with the horseshoe of laughter. The picture is perfection. Six reels that seem like one; six reels that are funnier than the work of any other human being; six reels that are sadder and simpler than anything in pictures; six reels that will atone for anything the movies have ever done."A reviewer from Theatre Magazine glowingly wrote, "[Chaplin's] new picture, The Kid, certainly outdoes in humor and the special brand of Chaplin pathos anything this popular film star has yet produced. There are almost as many tears as laughs in the new First National release--which proves the contention that Chaplin as almost as good a tragedian as he is a comedian. The Kid may be counted as a screen masterpiece."

The reviewer for The New York Times had more of a mixed reception of the film writing, "Charlie Chaplin is himself again - at his best, in some ways better than his previous best, and also, it is to be regretted, at his worst, only not with so much of his worst as has spoiled some of his earlier pictures." The reviewer praises the plot, the comedy, the characters, and the "balance of sadness" with Chaplin being "more of a comedian than a clown," but writes that "the blemish on The Kid is the same that has marred many of Chaplin's other pictures - vulgarity, or coarseness. There is only a little of it in the present work, just two scenes that will be found particularly offensive by some. They are funny. That cannot be denied. One laughs at them, but many try not to, and are provoked with themselves and Chaplin for their laughing. This is not good. The laugh that offends good taste doesn't win. And these scenes would never be missed from The Kid. It has plenty of unadulterated fun to go far and long without them. Why can't Chaplin leave out such stuff? Why don't the exhibitors delete it?"

Legacy
Chaplin biographer Jeffrey Vance writes of the legacy of Chaplin's The Kid: "The Kid remains an important contribution to the art of film, not only because of Chaplin’s innovative use of dramatic sequences within a feature-length comedy, but also because of the revelations The Kid provides about its creator. Undoubtedly, when Chaplin penned the preface to The Kid, “A picture with a smile--and perhaps, a tear,” he had his own artistic credo—and life—in mind." Mary Pickford said of the film, "The Kid is one of the finest examples of the screen language, depending upon its actions rather than upon subtitles".

In December 2011, The Kid was chosen to be preserved in the Library of Congress' National Film Registry. The registry stated that the film is "an artful melding of touching drama, social commentary and inventive comedy" and praised Chaplin's ability to "sustain his artistry beyond the length of his usual short subjects and could deftly elicit a variety of emotions from his audiences by skillfully blending slapstick and pathos."

As of January 2021, The Kid has earned a 100% rating on Rotten Tomatoes, based on 50 reviews, with a weighted average of 8.6/10. The website’s critical consensus says: “Charles Chaplin' irascible Tramp is given able support from Jackie Coogan as The Kid in this slapstick masterpiece, balancing the guffaws with moments of disarming poignancy”.

See also
 List of United States comedy films
 List of films with a 100% rating on Rotten Tomatoes, a film review aggregator website

References

External links

 The Kid essay on the National Film Registry website 
 
 
 The AFI Catalog of Feature Films : The Kid
 Scenes of The Kid
 The Kid: The Grail of Laughter and the Fallen Angel an essay by Tom Gunning at the Criterion Collection

1921 films
1921 comedy-drama films
American black-and-white films
1920s English-language films
American silent feature films
Films about adoption
Films about children
Films directed by Charlie Chaplin
Films shot in California
Films shot in Los Angeles
Melodrama films
United States National Film Registry films
Articles containing video clips
First National Pictures films
Surviving American silent films
1920s American films
Silent American comedy-drama films